4-Fluoromethylphenidate (also known as 4-FMPH and 4F-MPH) is a stimulant drug that acts as a higher potency dopamine reuptake inhibitor than the closely related methylphenidate.

4-Fluoromethylphenidate was studied further along with other analogues of (±)-threo-methylphenidate (TMP) to assess their potential as anti-cocaine medications. 4F-MPH was reported as having an ED50 mg/kg of 0.26 (0.18–0.36), regarding its efficacy as a substitute for cocaine, and a relative potency of 3.33 compared to methylphenidate for the same purpose. This is based on its binding strength to the dopamine transporter vs. its activity as a dopamine reuptake inhibitor.  In theory, this would block some of the effects of cocaine, without being as addictive. This has been misinterpreted as a dopamine vs. norepinephrine selectivity ratio.

Another study found that in the threo-isomers of methylphenidate, the meta- and para-substituted compounds with electron-withdrawing substituents tended to have increased binding potency. Compounds containing fluorine, chlorine, bromine and methyl groups were reported to be more potent than methylphenidate as well as the closely related compound 4F-EPH. 4F-MPH was reported as having the following values: [3H]WIN 35428 binding of 35.0 ± 3.0 (2) and [3H]dopamine 142 ± 2.0 (2).

Legal status
4-Fluoromethylphenidate is a Schedule I controlled substance in the US state Alabama.
As of 5 May 2017, 4-fluoromethylphenidate is a controlled substance in Canada.

See also 
 3-Bromomethylphenidate
 3,4-Dichloromethylphenidate
 4-Fluoroethylphenidate
 4-Methylmethylphenidate
 Dexmethylphenidate
 HDEP-28
 HDMP-28
 Isopropylphenidate

References 

2-Benzylpiperidines
Carboxylate esters
Designer drugs
Methyl esters
Norepinephrine–dopamine reuptake inhibitors
Stimulants
2-Piperidinyl compounds